Ahangaran-e Kaviani (also Romanized as Āhangarān-e Kāvīānī; also known as Āhangarān) is a village in Hendmini Rural District, Badreh District, Darreh Shahr County, Ilam Province, Iran. At the 2006 census, its population was 155, in 33 families. The village is populated by Lurs.

References 

Populated places in Darreh Shahr County
Luri settlements in Ilam Province